Kyle Zych (born December 9, 1996) is an American ice sled hockey player. He was a member of the United States national team that won gold at the 2022 Winter Paralympics.

Career
Zych has been a member of the United States national team since the 2018–19 season. He made his national debut for the United States at the 2019 World Para Ice Hockey Championships and won a gold medal. He represented the United States at the 2022 Winter Paralympics and won a gold medal.

References 

1996 births
Living people
People from South Hadley, Massachusetts
American sledge hockey players
Paralympic sledge hockey players of the United States
Paralympic gold medalists for the United States
Para ice hockey players at the 2022 Winter Paralympics
Medalists at the 2022 Winter Paralympics
Paralympic medalists in sledge hockey